Nelson C. Johnson (born 1948) is an American author and former judge, lawyer and historian, best known for his 2002 New York Times bestseller, Boardwalk Empire: The Birth, High Times, and Corruption of Atlantic City. His book served as the basis for the popular and Emmy Award-winning HBO period political crime drama TV series Boardwalk Empire.

Early life
Nelson C. Johnson was born in 1948 and was raised in both Atlantic County, New Jersey and New York City. He attended St. John's University and earned a bachelor's degree in political science from there. He also went on to earn a JD from the law school of Villanova University.

Johnson is a life-long resident of Hammonton, New Jersey.

Law career
Johnson was admitted to the New Jersey Bar in 1974. He represented the Atlantic City Planning Board in the early 1980s. In explaining his motivation to write Boardwalk Empire, Johnson explained "It [City Hall] was dysfunctional and corrupt. I thought, in order to do my job here, I have to find out how it got this way. I didn't set out to write a book. I just wanted a better understanding."

Johnson retired from his position as a New Jersey Superior Court Judge in September, 2018. During his tenure on the bench, he handled mass tort cases/product liability claims.

Writing career 

Nelson's 2002 book Boardwalk Empire was the basis for the HBO drama series Boardwalk Empire. Its sequel is The Northside: African Americans and the Creation of Atlantic City.  In 2010, Nelson was asked by the New Jersey State Superior Court to cease promoting the book and the series in order to preserve the ethical neutrality of his position as a judge.<ref>"Boardwalk Empire Author Muzzled". Observer'''.</ref>

His third book, published by Rutgers University Press, is Battleground New Jersey: Vanderbilt, Hague and Their Fight for Justice'', and is about Jersey City Mayor Frank Hague and Arthur T. Vanderbilt, first chief justice of New Jersey’s modern Supreme Court.

References

External links
 Nelson Johnson's Official Website
 Boardwalk Empire

1948 births
Living people
21st-century American writers
People from Hammonton, New Jersey
New Jersey state court judges
21st-century American historians
21st-century American male writers
St. John's University (New York City) alumni
Villanova University alumni
Villanova University School of Law alumni
Boardwalk Empire
Historians from New Jersey
American male non-fiction writers